Gog is the name of several fictional characters in the comics published by DC Comics. The first version first appeared in New Year's Evil: Gog #1 (February 1998), and was created by Mark Waid and Jerry Ordway.

Fictional character biography

The Kingdom

The first version of Gog was known as William, the sole survivor of a nuclear disaster in Kansas that was caused by the Parasite's shattering of Captain Atom during a battle with the Justice League, and became a believer in Superman as a savior, even creating a church dedicated to his philosophy as he tried to find meaning in the cataclysm that had taken place, believing that it was Superman's will that Earth be punished for forsaking him. One day, Superman visited him and told him that he wasn't the omnipotent, perfect being that William thought he was, stating that Kansas happened simply because he wasn't there, shattering William's world view and mentally unbalancing him. When the Quintessence (Shazam (DC Comics), Ganthet, Zeus, Highfather, and the Phantom Stranger) invested him with a portion of their vast power, William, now known as Gog, went insane and blamed Superman for his misfortune, believing him to be the Anti-Christ who had allowed the Kansas disaster to take place to regain his standing in the world.

Using his newfound powers, Gog killed Superman. Unsatisfied by his victory, Gog traveled 24 hours back in time, found Superman, and killed him again, repeating the process over and over, going backwards one day further each time, and each time varying the means of Superman's death and absorbing portions of the slain Supermen's powers after taking Amazo's ability. When he arrived on the day that Superman and Wonder Woman's child was born, the entire Justice League tried to stop him, but they failed, and Gog took the child, deciding to go directly to the past where he intended to trigger the Kansas cataclysm almost twenty years early, burning Superman's insignia into the countryside.

Gog's actions exposed the existence of Hypertime, a fictional construct similar to the Multiverse in pre-Crisis stories. Gog unknowingly passed into an alternate timeline each day he traveled back in time, effectively killing a different Superman at every turn. As a result, Hypertime's guardian (who is later revealed to be the Kingdom Come's iterations of Superman and Wonder Woman's son's future self), was forced to recruit time traveler Rip Hunter of the Linear Men, the only other person aware of Hypertime, in an attempt to preserve the secret, the other members of the Quintessence refusing to act to stop Gog for their own personal reasons.

Rip Hunter, refusing to believe the other Linear Men's claims that traveling back in time would destroy the Kingdom Come reality, recruited Superman, Batman, Wonder Woman, Kid Flash III (daughter of Wally West), Offspring (son of Plastic Man), Nightstar (daughter of Nightwing and Starfire), and Ibn al Xu'ffasch (son of Batman and Talia al Ghul) from the Kingdom Come reality, along with the Superman, Batman and Wonder Woman from the present to fight Gog, luring him into Booster Gold's "Planet Krypton", a superhero-themed restaurant that had been stocked with artifacts from various realities before Hunter moved the restaurant outside of time to limit civilian casualties. With the available arsenal, the heroes managed to wound Gog, with Batman using a Phantom Zone projector to partially send Gog into the Zone, severely scarring him while the heroes armed themselves. Gog fought back, knocking the heroes down as he himself collapsed in a weakened state. Unable to move from the force of the attack, the present Superman was convinced to fight back by the future Wonder Woman, who told him of the destruction of Kansas and how it happened as a result of him abandoning his fight for truth and justice following the death of Lois Lane. Refusing to allow those events to occur in his life, Superman charged at Gog, sending both of them and everyone else in the restaurant into Hypertime, thus allowing Hunter to preserve the Kingdom Come reality. Gog is then returned to the future by Rip Hunter and the future versions of Superman, Batman, and Wonder Woman, who demand that the Quintessence restore him to the person he was.

In the Name of Gog

A second version of Gog with a different origin appeared several years later in DC continuity. This version of Gog is a survivor of Imperiex’ attack on Topeka, Kansas. He was saved by Superman, but Superman was unable to rescue the boy's parents. Desperate to fix what had gone wrong, Gog grew up researching the science of time travel in an effort to go back in time and rescue his family.

Eventually, he succeeds in his efforts at creating a time machine, but his first prototype is unable to travel far enough back. He refines the time machine for over 200 thousand years, making it more and more powerful and using the technology to give himself super-powers. He then gives his research and advanced technology to younger versions of himself, which gives him more power due to rewriting history over and over. Realizing that he could not save his parents due to a temporal paradox (the death of his parents triggered the creation of his powers) his desire grows from saving his parents to punishing Superman for their deaths.

The present day Gog attacks Superman when Doomsday returns to Earth with newfound sentience and begins discovering emotions during his rampage. Doomsday arrives to see Superman on the verge of death after being beaten by an army of Gogs. Doomsday leaps to Superman's defense just as Gog is about to kill him. Doomsday's attempt to save Superman fails as Gog successfully kills him.

Over the next 200 years, Doomsday leads an army in Superman's name against Gog. This future is erased when it is revealed that Gog didn't actually kill Superman but has instead been keeping him prisoner and surrounded by Kryptonite.

Gog offers Superman the chance to go back in time and kill him. Superman eventually shows Gog the error of his ways when Doomsday bursts in and rescues Superman. Gog then offers Doomsday the chance to go back and erase this future at the cost of returning to his villainous ways which he agrees to. In the present, the present day Gog teleports away an unconscious Doomsday for unknown reasons.

Thy Kingdom Come
A third version of Gog appeared in the Justice Society of America ongoing series. In the new Multiverse, the events of the Kingdom Come limited series take place on Earth-22. That world's version of Superman arrived on New Earth following the destruction of Earth-22. Gog appears soon after the other Superman's arrival. Gog gruesomely slaughters metahuman criminals who claim to be gods by blasting holes through their chests and disintegrating their hearts. Some of his kills include the criminals Goth and Chroma and a group of beings calling themselves the New Olympians. The Infinity-Man and Hercules were two who survived his onslaught. After facing off against the Infinity-Man, he attacks Sandman who was spying on him, before taking on the Justice Society.

This version of Gog is a priest named William Matthews who received his powers from an underground citadel in Africa and took the name Gog, which was the name of the last surviving god of the Third World. He also claims that the Superman of Earth-22 let Kansas die, and is implied several times to be a ret-conned version of the character appearing in "In the Name of Gog" story above, with his background changed due to the events of Infinite Crisis. When the Justice Society follow him back to the citadel, his body is absorbed by a stone face on a wall. The stone face rises, becoming a massive stone man adorned in gold who claims to be the one, true Gog.

This Gog, chronologically the first one, is an exile of the "Third World" who was unwilling to take sides in the final battle of the Old Gods and was cast off as a result. He then plunged into the Bleed and traveled through various alternate universes until he landed on New Earth. Inert, his consciousness lingered in the stone and lava. A local tribe built a staff out of his remnants, enabling a user to channel Gog's energy. The staff was later found by William Matthews, who claimed the name Gog.

Upon being revived, Gog claims that Matthews wasn't his servant and that Matthews had been driven mad from visions of the Multiverse, including having visions of events on Earth-22.

This version of Gog displays a cheerful, childlike, peaceful personality. He claims he is "happy to be alive" and compelled to "make things good again". He saves an African village near his citadel from the effects of toxic contamination from lava that contained his essence and heals Damage's disfigured face in response to his skepticism. Gog then sends Sandman to a blissful, dream-filled sleep for twenty-four hours, cures Starman of his schizophrenia, gives Doctor Mid-Nite his sight back, and sends Power Girl "home". Gog then hears the noises of a war going on nearby and vows to stop it. Finding a small village under attack by a rogue militia, Gog transforms the soldiers into trees. During the conflict, Lance, one of the JSA's new recruits, is hit by a rocket launcher blast and killed. Gog brings Lance back to life, replacing his ruined arm with gold armor, and renames him "Magog".

Later, Gog's intentions to move on to the Middle East and punish the warmongers there in the same fashion as the militia members causes the Justice Society to split in half, with Hawkman, Magog, Damage, Wildcat (Tom Bronson), Amazing Man, Judomaster, and Citizen Steel taking Gog's side. Like the biblical God, he asks for a rest on the seventh day, sending some of his followers back to America to preach his will. At the same time, the rest of the JSA who did not choose to follow Gog have started to realize that Gog's wishes have various negative side-effects; Starman fears that he cannot complete his mission in the past with his sanity intact, the loss of Sandman's prophetic dreams has cost him one of his greatest edges in hunting criminals, Doctor Mid-Nite feels hindered by the loss of his unique sight after so long with it, Power Girl finds that she has been sent to a 'new' Earth-Two with an existing counterpart for herself, and while Damage cannot see it, his restored face makes him increasingly vain and arrogant, dismissing his past to the point of burning down his father's home while constantly checking out his reflection in mirrors and believing that people only want to talk to him because he's so handsome.

After the last day apart, Gog collects the heroes again, asking them gleefully to kneel down and worship him while he brings in a new world. The rest of the JSA arrive, having learned from Sandman that Gog is rooting himself into the Earth, and if he remains for one more day, the Earth will die if he ever leaves, leaving them with the one option of killing Gog and separating his head from the Earth. Hawkman and the rest of the Society following Gog attempt to protect him, until they see him attempt to transform Jay Garrick into lightning. All of Gog's followers turn against him and Gog punishes the Society by taking away his "gifts" to an extreme degree (Citizen Steel now feels pain in all his nerves and Starman can't be cured of his madness). Even Magog eventually turns on him, for which Gog's blessing on him is also undone. Citizen Steel breaks Gog's leg with a single punch and eventually, the JSA are able to topple Gog and cut off his head. The Superman of Earth-22 and Starman take the still-living head to the Source Wall, embedding it there for all eternity. Gog accuses Superman of being exactly what he accused Gog of being.

Powers and abilities
The first version of Gog used a cosmic staff – imbued with the powers of the Quintessence – as his initial weapon and later used a trick he claimed to have learned from the Amazo of 2020 to absorb the powers of several alternate Supermen that he killed. His abilities included travelling through time at will, extremely keen senses, sufficient speed to intercept the Flash, superhuman strength considerably greater than Superman's and the prodigious intelligence needed to develop an almost infinite number of highly inventive and complicated ways to kill Superman.

The second Gog's powers were based on science rather than cosmic or mystical power. This Gog also has the power to give other superhumans advanced abilities through the use of Kryptonite, such as imbuing Repo Man with enhanced strength and the ability to grow in size, in order to battle Superboy and a weakened Superman. He was also capable of flight, energy blasts, the creation (through time manipulation) of countless copies of himself and his spear, and teleportation throughout time and space.

The third version of Gog is actually a god from the Third World, Urgrund, the world that once encompassed the two halves, New Genesis and Apokolips, of the Fourth World. As such he possesses a huge and boundless amount of cosmic powers. However, he chooses to use them in a reactive rather than proactive way, merely granting "wishes" to "make people around him happy". Theoretically able to reshape reality at will, he confines himself into granting people their innermost desires, often without bothering to consult with them first, which can lead to mishaps: for example, he restores Doctor Mid-Nite's vision to normal, but this leaves Mid-Nite deprived of the enhanced vision he had grown used to when performing more delicate operations in the field; he took away Sand's nightmarish visions, depriving Sand of his key resource when conducting investigations. This Gog also displays a childlike and narrow-minded personality, looking at the world with glee and awe, but he clearly understands what he is doing. He performs these miracles so that Earth's people will worship him in return for his gifts, and punished those who reject him— e.g., by turning enemy soldiers into trees, arguing that he wasn't technically killing them. When the JSA attacks him, he removes his blessings on all of them, even those who are still loyal to him at the time, purely out of spite, and even nearly transforms the Flash into lightning before Superman manages to deflect the blast.

In other media

Figurine
DC Direct released a cold-cast porcelain, hand-painted medium-sized statue of The Kingdom's version of Gog in 1998, based upon designs by artist Jerry Ordway. The statue was limited to 3,000 pieces and measured 7 7/8 x 5 x 5 inches, and came with an official certificate of authenticity from DC Comics.

References

External links
 Annotated Kingdom #1
 Gog I at DC Database Project #2

Articles about multiple fictional characters
Comics characters introduced in 1998
DC Comics characters who can move at superhuman speeds
DC Comics characters who can teleport
DC Comics characters with accelerated healing
DC Comics characters with superhuman strength
DC Comics male supervillains
DC Comics orphans
Fictional characters from Kansas
Fictional characters who can duplicate themselves
Fictional mass murderers
Fictional priests and priestesses
Fictional sole survivors
Fourth World (comics)